Francine Racette (born September 23, 1947) is a retired Canadian actress. She is best known for her performances in Au revoir les enfants, Lumière and The Disappearance. She is the current and third wife of actor Donald Sutherland and mother of three of his sons: actor Rossif Sutherland, actor Angus Sutherland and Roeg Sutherland.

Racette was born in Joliette, Quebec. She graduated with a diploma from National Theatre School of Canada in 1966.

Filmography 
1960s
Le Grand Rock (1969)
1970s
Reportages sur un squelette ou Masques et bergamasques (1970, TV Movie)
Aussi loin que l'amour (1971) as Isabelle
Four Flies on Grey Velvet (1971) as Dalia
Les vilaines manières (fr) (1973) as Jeanne
Alien Thunder (1974) as Emilie Grant
Lumière (1976) as Julienne
Monsieur Klein (1976) as Françoise / Cathy
Un type comme moi ne devrait jamais mourir (fr) (1976) as Suzy Bloom
The Disappearance (1977) as Celandine
1980s
Au revoir, les enfants (1987) as Mme. Quentin (final film role)

Award nomination 
In 1977, Racette was nominated for a César award for Best Supporting Actress for her role as Julienne in Lumière.

References

External links 

1947 births
Living people
People from Joliette
French Quebecers
Sutherland family
Canadian television actresses
20th-century Canadian actresses
Canadian film actresses